Kalwas is a village in India.

Kalwas may also refer to:
Andrzej Kalwas, Polish lawyer and politician
Piotr Ibrahim Kalwas, Polish writer and journalist